Cao Futian was a Chinese nationalist and leader of the Boxers during the Boxer Uprising. He was executed in 1901.

Biography 

Little is known of the early life of Cao Futian but he was born during the 19th century, in Jinghai, Zhili province, China.
Cao had been a soldier. He raised a militia in Tiānjīn, formed in its majority by illiterate people such as laid-off railway workers, Chinese religious fanatics, criminals, and unemployed youth. He was a master of Kung Fu and a charismatic leader. Cao hated foreigners because of the establishment of the foreign concessions, but even more because of the spread of Christianity by missionaries. He thought Chinese Christians should be expelled for tainting the purity of the Chinese culture. First hostile to the Chinese Imperial Army, he fought them in August 1899. The Qing government was divided as to how to react to the Boxers’ activities, but conservative elements of the court were in favour of them. Prince Duan, a fervent supporter of the cause, arranged a meeting between Cao and Empress Dowager Ci Xi. At the meeting, the crown prince even wore a Boxer uniform to show alliance.

Cao Futian was also a spiritual leader for the Boxers, and many believed he had divine abilities. Along with Zhang Decheng, another Boxer leader, he was said to be able to make himself disappear, and to have powers of bilocation.

In 1900, he set up his headquarters at 18 Hejia Lane, Ruyyi'an Street of Hongqiao District, Tiānjīn, at an old temple venerating Lü Dongbin, which is now the Boxer Museum, Memorial Hall of the Boxer Uprising (Lu Zu Tang).

On 14 July 1900, Tiānjīn was captured by the Allied forces of the Eight-Nation Alliance after a three-day battle. Cao Futian, who was present, had to flee to Jinghai. In May 1901, he was captured by the government.

Cao was executed in 1901 following his arrest in Jinghai for conspiring to stir up conflict. He was beheaded.

References 

Chinese nationalists
Boxer Rebellion
Qing dynasty rebels
19th-century Chinese people
1901 deaths
Year of birth missing
Chinese people of the Boxer Rebellion